Azpilicueta is a Basque surname. Notable people with this surname include the following:

César Azpilicueta (born 1989), Spanish footballer, currently playing for Chelsea
Francis Xavier (1506–1552), born Francisco de Jasso y Azpilicueta, Roman Catholic missionary
Martín de Azpilcueta (1491–1586), Spanish canonist, theologian and economist

Basque-language surnames